St. John Bosco High School (SJBHS) is a Catholic, all-boys college preparatory high school located in Bellflower, California, and conducted by the San Francisco Province of the Salesians of St. John Bosco. St. John Bosco High School is named after Saint John Bosco, an Italian saint known for his dedication to educating and advocating for youth and for his "Home-School-Church-Playground" model of education. Bosco was founded as an elementary and intermediate boarding school in 1940. The first high school class graduated in 1956, and in 1979 the boarding school closed.

Academics
St. John Bosco High School prepares all graduates to successfully enter and meet the rigors of higher education. All Bosco students complete a structured college preparatory curriculum that exceeds the minimum A-G requirements set by the University of California and California State University systems. The school offers 31 Advanced Placement (AP) and Honors courses, six dual enrollment college courses, plus championship Academic Decathlon and robotics programs.

Students at St. John Bosco High School can apply to one of six unique Academic Pathways, in either Biomedical Science, Engineering, Sports Medicine, Computer Science, Entrepreneurship, and Film and Media Arts. The Academic Pathways provide advanced, discipline-specific courses and offer opportunities for internships, field work, capstone projects, and co-curricular competitions. Biomedical students participate in internships with the COPE Health Scholar Program, Engineering students intern with Pelican Products, Sports Medicine students can intern with Rio Hondo College, Long Beach City College, and Response Care Chiropractic.

Among the graduating class of 2019, 96% were accepted to a four-year college or university, including admission to 22 of U.S. News & World Report's top 25 national schools.  Bosco alumni are currently studying at Brown, Princeton, Stanford, MIT, Dartmouth, Georgetown, all UC campuses, all CSU campuses, and the US Military, Air Force, and Naval Academies.  98% of St. John Bosco graduating seniors in the past decade have entered institutions of higher learning.

Visual and Performing Arts
St. John Bosco High School allows a rich culture of the arts on campus. A few of the elaborate programs offered on campus range from the award winning, Braves Marching Band & Color Guard to the SJB Theatre Department as well as a wide variety of art courses. Most recently established is the academic pathway, the film and media pathway that allows students to discover their passion for a possible career in the film industry.

Notable alumni

Chad Allen – actor 
Steve Carfino – basketball player for the Iowa Hawkeyes and Australian National Basketball League
James Cotton – former NBA player for the Seattle SuperSonics
Schea Cotton – basketball player
Joe Cowan – graduated in 2003, holds numerous school records in track and field and football; played for the UCLA Bruins football team
Patrick Cowan – graduated in 2004, starting quarterback for the UCLA Bruins football team and NFL player
Benjamin Cruz – retired Chief Justice of Guam, Democratic Senator in the Guam Legislature, member Democratic National Committee
Wyatt Davis – offensive lineman for the Minnesota Vikings
Tim DeRuyter – Cal defensive coordinator and former Fresno State head coach
Tyler Dorsey – basketball player for the Atlanta Hawks, Memphis Grizzlies, and Maccabi Tel Aviv of the Israeli Premier League and the EuroLeague
Nomar Garciaparra – graduated in 1991, MLB player for the Boston Red Sox, Chicago Cubs, Los Angeles Dodgers, and Oakland Athletics; currently a TV commentator for the Los Angeles Dodgers
Jelani Gardner – McDonald's All-American basketball player for Cal and Pepperdine
Isaac Hamilton – college basketball player
Todd Husak – Stanford and NFL quarterback
Joey Karam – plays keyboard/synthesizer for The Locust and One Day as a Lion
Matthew Katnik – 2-time NCAA All-American in track and field for shot put
Dennis Lamp – MLB pitcher for the Chicago Cubs (1977–80), Chicago White Sox (1981–83), Toronto Blue Jays (1984–86), Oakland Athletics (1987), Boston Red Sox (1988–91) and Pittsburgh Pirates
Evan Longoria – graduated in 2003, San Francisco Giants third baseman, 2008 American League rookie of the year
Trent McDuffie – Super Bowl LVII champion, cornerback for the Kansas City Chiefs
Leon McFadden – San Francisco 49ers cornerback
Aaron Pico – former freestyle wrestler, current MMA fighter
Keith Price – former University of Washington quarterback. Quarterback for the Birmingham Iron in the AAF
Nolan Warner – graduated in 2015, Astronaut
Bud Smith – MLB pitcher for the St. Louis Cardinals, one of only 18 MLB pitchers since 1900 to throw no-hitter during his rookie season
Bryce Treggs – NFL wide receiver
Jacob Tuioti-Mariner – NFL defensive tackle
DJ Uiagalelei – quarterback for the Clemson Tigers/Oregon State Beavers
Zahid Valencia – folkstyle and freestyle wrestler
 Hector Andrade - Former freestyle wrestler

References

External links

St. John Bosco High School website

Boys' schools in California
Bellflower, California
Roman Catholic secondary schools in Los Angeles County, California
Salesian secondary schools
1940 establishments in California
Educational institutions established in 1940
Catholic secondary schools in California